Florin Cornel Stângă (born 22 June 1978) is a Romanian football manager and former player. As a footballer, Stângă played for FC Brașov, Metrom Brașov, Pandurii Târgu Jiu or Skoda Xanthi, among others. He is currently the head coach of Liga II side Viitorul Târgu Jiu.

References

External links
 
 

1978 births
Living people
Sportspeople from Brașov
Romanian footballers
Association football midfielders
Liga I players
Liga II players
Super League Greece players
FC Brașov (1936) players
ASC Daco-Getica București players
CS Pandurii Târgu Jiu players
Xanthi F.C. players
ASA 2013 Târgu Mureș players
CSM Corona Brașov footballers
Sepsi OSK Sfântu Gheorghe players
Romanian expatriate footballers
Expatriate footballers in Greece
Romanian expatriate sportspeople in Greece
Romanian football managers
SR Brașov managers
FC Astra Giurgiu managers
LPS HD Clinceni managers
ACS Viitorul Târgu Jiu managers